Mahmudi may refer to:

Mahmudi (tribe) a 16th/17th-century Ottoman-Kurdish tribe
Mahmudi, Band-e Zarak, a village in Minab County, Hormozgan Province, Iran
Mahmudi, Howmeh, a village in Minab County, Hormozgan Province, Iran
Mahmudi, Baft, a village in Kerman Province, Iran
Mahmudi, Rafsanjan, a village in Kerman Province, Iran
Mahmudi, North Khorasan, a village in Iran
Mahmudi, Razavi Khorasan, a village in Iran
Mahmudi, Sistan and Baluchesstan, a village in Iran
Mahmudi, Yazd, a village in Iran
Mahmudi (cloth), a fine cotton variety cloth produced in India
Mahmoudi
Özalp (District), Van